is Pink Lady's ninth single release, and their eighth number-one hit on the Oricon charts. The single sold 1,150,000 copies, and spent four weeks at number one.

According to Oricon, this was the sixth best selling single from 1978. A re-recorded version of the song was included on the 2-disc greatest hits release, INNOVATION, released in December 2010.

The B-side was the theme song for the TBS puppet show .

Track listing (7" vinyl)
All lyrics are written by Yū Aku; all music is composed and arranged by Shunichi Tokura.

Chart positions

Cover versions
 Trasparenza covered the song in their 2002 album Pink Lady Euro Tracks.
 ManaKana recorded a cover version for the 2009 Pink Lady/Yū Aku tribute album Bad Friends. The cover song is also in their 2009 album Futari Uta 2.

References

External links
 
 

1978 singles
1978 songs
Pink Lady (band) songs
Japanese-language songs
Disco songs
Oricon Weekly number-one singles
Songs with lyrics by Yū Aku
Songs with music by Shunichi Tokura
Victor Entertainment singles